The Tondeka Metropolitan Kampala Bus Service (TMBS), is the proposed principal public transport operator in the Kampala metropolitan area. Expected to start in September 2020, the bus system, Tondeka Metro, proposes to serve the city of Kampala, Uganda's capital, the city of Entebbe, including Entebbe International Airport, Buloba, Nsangi, Ssabagabo, Mukono, Kira Town, Matugga, Wakiso, and the areas in Mukono District and Wakiso District that connect with these urban centers.

History
The Kampala metropolitan area (Kampala, Entebbe, Wakiso District and Mukono District) had a total population of approximately four million residents according to the August 2014 national population census. More than half of this total population pour onto the narrow roads leading to Kampala city center to go to work, school, hospitals, court, banks or to access other government and private services. This leads to gridlock on the city streets and roads as commuter taxis (kamunye), motorcycle taxis (boda boda), private automobiles, street hawkers, pedestrians and VIP convoys jostle for space.

System
The major stake holders in a modern, functional, sustainable, public transit system in Kampala's metropolitan area have come together and propose a bus system starting with 980 commuter  buses, procured new from the manufacturers, Ashok Leyland, in India. However, a presidential directive in 2021 banned the importation of foreign fully or partly assembled buses. Kiira Motors Corporation became the only potential suppliers of the required buses. The first five buses came online in September 2022.

Stakeholders
The major stakeholders in Tondeka Metro Bus Service include, but are not limited to the following:

Routes
As of January 2020, the following bus routes are suggested, to start with:

Fare structure
On 11 December 2019, The Post Media Limited (PML Daily) online publication reported that a single route is expected to  cost USh1,200 (approx. US$0.33); unlimited daily travel to cost USh3,500 (approx. US$1.00); Shs18,000 (approx. US$5.00) for a weekly card and Sh55,000 (approx. US$15.00) for a monthly travel card. Passengers are expected to pay using Radio Frequency Identification Cards (rfid-Cards) to swipe their way on board, with no cash payment allowed on the bus.

Hours of operation
The organizers of the Tondeka Metro Bus Service are planning to have the buses run 24/7, with provisions for people with disabilities and pregnant mothers.

Funding
The funding modalities have not been finalized. At a minimum, both the Uganda Government through the Ministry of Finance and high net-worth individuals who own fleets of commuter taxis and motorcycle taxis are expected to fund the project as a public-private partnership enterprise. The initial investment is reported to be US$200 million (USh737.9 billion).

Expansion plans
The initial shipment of 400 buses in September 2020 is expected to be followed by 200 buses the following month and every month thereafter until the total comes to 980 buses. If and when the initial project succeeds, more buses will be imported to expand the project to other areas of the Kampala metropolis.

Recent developments
In April 2022, it was reported that TMBS had selected Israel-made Optibus, the artificial intelligence software to carry out mass transport planning. The initial 1,080 fleet is expected to grow to over 3,000 by 2032. The World Bank is also reported to participate in the funding of this project.

In September 2022, Tondeka Bus Survive received a batch of five buses from Kiira Motors Corporation, being the first of six similar deliveries planned in 2022, bringing the total to thirty units. Another 600 buses are expected in 2023. The current buses are diesel coaches, but fully electric units are expected among future deliveries.

Photo
 Photograph of Prototype Tondeka Metro Bus

See also
 Kampala–Entebbe Road
 Entebbe–Kampala Expressway
 Kampala Northern Bypass Highway
 Kampala Southern Bypass Highway

References

External links
 Official Website
Real Time Road Traffic Feed of Kampala Streets

Transport in Uganda
Bus transport in Africa
Proposed public transport in Africa
Organisations based in Kampala
Mukono District
Wakiso District
2020 establishments in Uganda
Bus rapid transit in Africa
Transport in Kampala